Hanns Joachim "Hajo" Friedrichs (15 March 1927 – 28 March 1995) was a German journalist.

Life 
Friedrichs was born in Hamm. From 1971 to 1981, he was a sports journalist for the German magazine Sportstudio. 1985  Friedrichs went from ZDF to ARD. In Germany Friedrichs became famous as the anchorman for the television news program Tagesthemen, which he moderated alternately with Ulrike Wolf (*1944) and later Sabine Christiansen. He was succeeded by Ulrich Wickert. Friedrichs died in March 1995 from lung cancer. The Hanns-Joachim-Friedrichs-Award for works in journalism is named after him.

On 9 November 1989 he announced to the German public that the Berlin Wall had fallen. He died in Hamburg.

Awards 
 Goldener Gong for Bilder aus Amerika, together with Dieter Kronzucker

References

External links 
 Website of Hanns-Joachim-Friedrichs-Award with biographical information
 Spiegel:Hanns Joachim Friedrichs (german)

German male journalists
German television presenters
German sports journalists
German sports broadcasters
German television reporters and correspondents
German broadcast news analysts
20th-century German journalists
People from Hamm
1927 births
1995 deaths
Deaths from lung cancer in Germany
German male writers
ARD (broadcaster) people
ZDF people
Norddeutscher Rundfunk people